Nikol Romanovna Gosviani (born 9 September 1996) is a Russian figure skater. She placed sixth at the 2013 European Championships.

Personal life 
Nikol Gosviani was born 9 September 1996 in Saint Petersburg. She studied music. She married Italian pair skater Leo Luca Sforza in June 2016.

Career 
Gosviani was coached by Natalia Golubeva until 2009 when she switched to Alexei Urmanov, the 1994 Olympic champion. She finished seventh in her only Junior Grand Prix event, the 2010 JGP Japan.

In the 2012–13 season, Gosviani was the third alternate for a place at the senior Russian Championships and was admitted after three skaters withdrew. She finished sixth in her debut at the event. With several skaters above her not age-eligible, Gosviani was named to the Russian team for the European Championships. She attained the minimum TES for the event at the Toruń Cup, where she won gold in the junior ladies' event. Gosviani made her senior international debut at the 2013 European Championships. She was twelfth in the short, fifth in the free, and sixth overall.

In the 2013–14 season, Gosviani's first international event was the Ondrej Nepela Memorial in October. She won the short program and placed second in the free to win the silver medal overall behind Haruka Imai of Japan. Gosviani was assigned to the 2013 Cup of China after Polina Korobeynikova withdrew. She placed fifth at the event, which was her senior Grand Prix debut. She finished eighth at the 2013 Rostelecom Cup and ninth at the 2014 Russian Championships. In July 2014, she decided to train in Moscow. Soon after, she tore ligaments in her ankle, causing her to miss the entire 2014–15 season.

In December 2015, Gosviani placed fourth at the Italian Championships.

Programs

Competitive highlights 
GP: Grand Prix; JGP: Junior Grand Prix

For Italy

For Russia

References

External links 
 

1996 births
Russian female single skaters
Living people
Figure skaters from Saint Petersburg
Russian people of Georgian descent